Sky Direct was a direct-broadcast satellite subscription television service in the Philippines owned and operated by Sky, a subsidiary of ABS-CBN. Sky Cable had been eyeing for a DBS service and considered on acquiring Dream Satellite TV from Antonio O. Cojuangco, Jr. The acquisition of Dream was reported to have reached an advanced stage but for some undisclosed reasons, the deal was not sealed. Sky's entry to the DBS market was hindered by various oppositions from the industry, citing legal issues and the slow growth of the pay TV market in the country. On December 23, 2015, Sky was granted by the NTC a provisional authority to operate and maintain a DBS service in 251 cities and municipalities in the country for a period of 18 months. Sky Direct offered both prepaid and postpaid packages with exclusive channels from ABS-CBN and Creative Programs  such as ABS-CBN HD, ABS-CBN News Channel, ABS-CBN Sports+Action HD, Cinema One, Jeepney TV, Metro Channel, Liga, and Myx. As of March 2019, Sky Direct had over 1 million subscribers.

On June 30, 2020, Sky Direct stopped operations due to the alias cease-and-desist order (ACDO) issued by the National Telecommunications Commission (NTC) and Solicitor General Jose Calida regarding the expiration of ABS-CBN's legislative franchise.

History
In May 2015, Sky Cable Corporation applied with the National Telecommunications Commission (NTC) for the roll-out of its DBS service with plans of spending at least 252 million pesos for the purchase of equipment (₱122 million) and working capital (₱130 million). On December 23, 2015, Sky Cable was granted a provisional authority by the NTC to operate and maintain a DBS service in 251 cities and municipalities for 18 months. Sky Cable plans to get 49,500 subscribers in the first year of operations and increase it to 864,600 subscribers in 10 years. NTC approved the application of Sky Cable to offer DBS services despite opposition from 14 companies from the cable and television industry.

In January 2016, Sky Direct began the trial period for its prepaid service in three areas through authorized dealers in Metro Manila, province of Cavite and Quezon.

Sky Direct had a soft launching on March 18, 2016, by releasing the television commercial advertisement with endorser Kris Aquino.

The Sky Direct prepaid subscription package includes a satellite dish antenna, set top box (Integrated Receiver-Decoder) and remote control.
Sky Direct uses the DVB-S2 digital television broadcast standard in the Ku band to provide standard definition (SD) and high definition (HD) TV broadcasts. For the conditional access, it uses the Verimatrix encryption system to scramble the data and protect its content from signal piracy.

On May 24, 2016, Luxembourg-based satellite owner SES S.A. announced a multi-year, multi-transponder capacity agreement with Sky Cable, Sky Direct's parent, to broadcast DTH television channels via the SES-9 and New Skies NSS-11 satellites at 108.2 degrees East. SES-9 is expected to be operational middle of 2016.

Sky Direct broadcast
In December 2015, Sky Direct began its test broadcast using SES NSS-11 satellite. But in May 2016, Sky Direct moved its full broadcast using SES-9 Satellite.

Competition
Sky Direct competes with Cignal, the leading DTH provider with more than two million subscribers  owned by the Philippine Long Distance Telephone Company (PLDT) through MediaQuest Holdings, and with G Sat owned by Global Satellite Technology Services.

Oppositions
The entry of Sky Direct in the DTH service was being opposed by various groups citing violation of the anti-monopoly law, including Cignal and its sister company TV5 Network under the PLDT group, Dream Satellite TV, and the Philippine Cable Television Association. In a filing with the NTC, PMSI said the DTH players in the Philippines are expected to continue incur losses due to tougher competition with the entry of Sky Cable. From 2009 to 2013, Cignal TV incurred an accumulated deficit of 5 billion pesos, Dream with 1.1 billion pesos, and GSat with 173 million pesos.

In February 2016, TV5 Network, Inc formally filed a motion for reconsideration with the NTC asking the regulator to dismiss Sky Cable's application to offer DBS and reverse its order from December 2015 that allowed Sky Cable to offer both wired and wireless cable network services nationwide. TV5 argued that DBS or wireless cable service is beyond the scope of Sky Cable’s franchise and articles of incorporation. According to TV5, Sky Cable's amended articles of incorporation states that it can establish and operate a cable television which is wired in nature and not a wireless service like DBS.  The regulator emphasized in its December 2015 order that DBS service is within the scope of Sky Cable's congressional franchise.

After that, Telecommunications Commissioner Gamaliel Cordoba announced that Sky Direct will cease operations, despite their objections made by Rodante Marcoleta, which he asked him to resign as commissioner and Boying Remulla's threat to face graft charges before the Ombudsman against him.

References

Sky (cable company)
Direct broadcast satellite services
Television in the Philippines
Entertainment companies of the Philippines
Entertainment companies established in 2016
Mass media companies established in 2016
Assets owned by ABS-CBN Corporation